The Saint John the Baptist's Church is the name given to a religious building of the Catholic Church, which functions as the parish church in Sandefjord, Norway.

The building was built between 1916 and 1918 in the Art Nouveau style for the Methodists and was inaugurated on 5 March 1918. The church building served as a Protestant parish for the Methodists in the city for 90 years, but was sold to the Catholic Church in 2008.

See also
Roman Catholicism in Norway
Roman Catholic Diocese of Oslo

References

Buildings and structures in Sandefjord
Art Nouveau church buildings in Norway
Roman Catholic churches completed in 1918
20th-century Roman Catholic church buildings in Norway